Shigisan Gyokuzōin (信貴山玉蔵院) is a Buddhist temple in Heguri, Nara Prefecture, Japan at Mount Shigi.

See also 
Thirteen Buddhist Sites of Yamato

External links 
 

Buddhist temples in Nara Prefecture
Vaiśravaṇa